Bass River State Recreation Area is a  recreation area, located in Allendale Charter Township and Robinson Township, Ottawa County, Michigan.  There is a multi-purpose,  trail that is used for cross country skiing, hiking, horseback riding and mountain biking. A gravel boat launch provides access to Max Lake and the Grand River. Hunting is allowed in the recreation area.

It is located at the mouth of the Bass River, where the smaller river flows into the Grand River, and enjoys approximately three miles of frontage on the larger river. Much of the recreation area is used to repurpose and rehabilitate an extensive field of gravel pits from which construction aggregate was quarried in the 20th century.  The nearest large community is Allendale, Michigan.

References

External links
 Bass River Recreation Area Michigan Department of Natural Resources
 Bass River Recreation Area Protected Planet (World Database on Protected Areas)

Protected areas of Ottawa County, Michigan
Allendale, Michigan
State recreation areas of Michigan